La Chacota is a 1962 Argentine film directed by Enrique Dawi.

Cast
 
 Luis Aguilé
 Héctor Calcaño
 Oscar Casco
 Augusto Codecá
 Julio De Grazia
 Evangelina Elizondo
 Cacho Espíndola
 Mariquita Gallegos	
 Bettina Hudson
 Marcelo Jaime
 Alberto Locatti
 Gladys Mancini
 Jorge Marchesini
 José Marrone
 Osvaldo Pacheco
 Fidel Pintos
 Raúl Ricutti
 Chela Ruíz

External links
 

1962 films
1960s Spanish-language films
Argentine black-and-white films
Films directed by Enrique Dawi
1960s Argentine films